Allocacoc is an industrial design company established in the Netherlands that sells redesigned everyday products such as the PowerCube. Allocacoc headquartered in Shanghai and has a factory in Suzhou with an R&D center in Shenzhen, China. Its European head office moved from Delft to Breukelen (Utrecht) in August 2018. The company creates innovative products by adding original designs and keeping them affordable. In 2019, Allocacoc decided on a rebranding strategy and focus their business development on DesignNest.com - a consumer product  platform of a broad range of design products. DesignNest was originally founded by Allocacoc in 2016 and now aiming to help industrial designers from start to finish, such as funding, design knowledge, sourcing, pricing, production, product assembly, distribution, fighting against copycats and worldwide sales.

History 
Allocacoc was founded by two industrial design engineers, Arthur Limpens and Yixia Jiang from Delft University of Technology, in the Netherlands.

Products 
Allocacoc has a wide range of products, including power strip, socket, light, stationary, home gadgets, audio...etc. and it is still expanding. 
 PowerCube® Original and USB: A compact power strip with multiple power outlets designed to charge multiple devices and blocking  each other.
 PowerCube® Rewirable : A power strip in the shape of a cube with travel adapters.
 DesignNest® Heng Balance Lamp : Winner of the Red Dot Design Award 2016, Heng Balance Lamp is a series of lamps with a “balance” function that reinvents how lamps are switched on.

Awards 
The PowerCube was given the Red Dot Design Award  for best product design category in 2014.

Computex Design and Innovation Award in 2015

References

External links 
 Official Allocacoc Company Website
 Official Allocacoc Europe Webshop
 Official Allocacoc USA Webshop
 Official Allocacoc China(P.R.C.) Webshop 阿乐乐可
 Ukraine Webshop(authorized)

Companies with year of establishment missing
Design companies of China
Design companies of the Netherlands
Companies based in Shanghai
Companies based in Utrecht (province)
Stichtse Vecht